Johan Herman Hakulinen (28 November 1866 – 11 November 1928) was a Finnish educationist, farmer and politician, born in Tohmajärvi. He was a member of the Diet of Finland from 1904 to 1905 and of the Parliament of Finland from 1907 to 1908, representing the Finnish Party.

References

1866 births
1928 deaths
People from Tohmajärvi
People from Kuopio Province (Grand Duchy of Finland)
Finnish Lutherans
Finnish Party politicians
Members of the Diet of Finland
Members of the Parliament of Finland (1907–08)
University of Helsinki alumni